Edward Henry Diachuk (August 16, 1936 — December 26, 2017) was a Canadian ice hockey player who played 12 games in the National Hockey League for the Detroit Red Wings during the 1960–61 season. The rest of his career, which lasted from 1955 to 1963, was mainly spent in the minor Western Hockey League.

Career statistics

Regular season and playoffs

References

External links
 

1936 births
2017 deaths
Canadian ice hockey left wingers
Detroit Red Wings players
Edmonton Flyers (WHL) players
Edmonton Oil Kings (WCHL) players
Ice hockey people from Alberta
Los Angeles Blades (WHL) players
People from Vegreville
Sudbury Wolves (EPHL) players
Vancouver Canucks (WHL) players